The Equitable Life (Payments) Act 2010 (c. 34) is an Act of the Parliament of the United Kingdom. It gives the HM Treasury the power to compensate more than a million policyholders adversely affected by the collapse of The Equitable Life Assurance Society in 1999.

Further reading

References

External links
 Equitable Life (Payments) Bill – official page on UK Parliament website

United Kingdom Acts of Parliament 2010